Bruce Anthony Bailey ALA FSA (born March 1937) is an English author, architectural historian, archivist, librarian, freelance lecturer and photographer.  He was elected a Fellow of the Society of Antiquaries of London on 1 January 2003. He lives near the village of Lowick, Northamptonshire, works as an archivist and librarian, and is a Trustee of the Northamptonshire Historic Churches Trust.

Early life
Bruce Bailey was born in Northampton.

Professional work 
Bailey works as Archivist/Librarian at Drayton House, a Grade I listed stately home near Lowick, Northamptonshire; he also does archival work for the Spencer family's Althorp Estate.

Photographs by Bailey of buildings in Northamptonshire, Oxfordshire, Warwickshire, Hertfordshire, Leicestershire and Herefordshire are held in the Historic England Archive.  Photographs by him are also held in the Conway Library archive of the Courtauld Institute of Art, University of London, currently undergoing a digitisation project known as Courtauld Connects. Around 70 of his photographs of monuments and statues can be viewed on the Courtauld's Art & Architecture website.

Publications

Sole author

Co-author

Contributions to Pevsner Architectural Guides

Selected articles in Northamptonshire Past & Present

Other articles and contributions 
Contributed drawings and cartography to R L Greenall, A History of Northamptonshire, London: Phillimore, 1979. 
Contributed photographs to Margaret Whinney, Sculpture in Britain, 1530-1830, 2nd edition, New Haven: Yale University Press, 1992. 
Biographical article on Sir Charles Edmund Isham, Oxford Dictionary of National Biography, 2004.
'Drayton House and its Marble Buffet: A Reconstruction', article with sketch plan and colour illustration, The Furniture History Society newsletter, May 2008.

References 

English architectural historians
English archivists
English librarians
English photographers
Living people
People from Northamptonshire
Fellows of the Society of Antiquaries of London
1937 births
English architecture writers